Ken Fletcher and Margaret Smith were the defending champions, but Smith did not compete.f

Owen Davidson and Billie Jean King defeated Fletcher and Maria Bueno in the final, 7–5, 6–2 to win the mixed doubles tennis title at the 1967 Wimbledon Championships.

Seeds

  Owen Davidson /  Billie Jean King (champions)
  Ken Fletcher /  Maria Bueno (final)
  Tony Roche /  Judy Tegart (fourth round)
  Frew McMillan /  Annette Van Zyl (semifinals)

Draw

Finals

Top half

Section 1

Section 2

Section 3

Section 4

Bottom half

Section 5

Section 6

Section 7

Section 8

References

External links

X=Mixed Doubles
Wimbledon Championship by year – Mixed doubles